Loch Leitir Easaidh is a small shallow irregular shaped freshwater lochan that flows directly into the northwestern end of Loch Assynt in Assynt, Sutherland, Scotland. The loch is located in an area along with neighbouring Coigach, as the Assynt-Coigach National Scenic Area, one of 40 such areas in Scotland.

Geography
Loch Leitir Easaidh sits of the eastern end of a low-lying plateau, that is heavily populated with a number of other lochs to the east, that drain into Loch Inver basin. At the northern end of the plateau is a trending fault that travels in a northwest–southeast direction, traveling through Loch Assynt, Loch Leitir Easaidh along Gleannan Salach, through Loch na Loinne to Loch Poll and the coast.

To the north and northeast sit the three peaks of the Quinag,() that sit in a Y-shaped crest. The three Corbett summits are Quinag - Sail Gorm at 776m, Quinag - Sail Gharbh at 808m and Quinag - Spidean Coinich at 764 m.

Walking and fishing
The loch is popular with both fly-fisherman and walkers and has an all-access, all-abilities walk that has been developed by the Culag Community Woodland Trust. Two toilet blocks are provided at the loch.

The predominant species of fish found in the region were recently catalogued during a survey in November 2019.  The predominant species of fish are trout and Salvelinus (char).

References

Freshwater lochs of Scotland
Inver catchment
Lochs of Highland (council area)